, also known as Autobahn der Freiheit  (English: Motorway of Freedom) is an autobahn in northeastern Germany, connecting Berlin to the Polish border.

Exit list 

 

 
 
 
 
 

|-
|colspan="3"|

 
|'' 
|}

References

External links 

12
A012
Constituent roads of European route E30